Holland with Boston was a county constituency represented in the House of Commons of the Parliament of the United Kingdom from 1918 to 1997.  It elected one Member of Parliament (MP) by the first past the post system of election.

History
The constituency was created in 1918 and abolished in 1997. By the time of its abolition, it was a safe Conservative seat. However, Holland with Boston had been held by both the Liberal and Labour parties before the Second World War.

From 1885 to 1918 the parliamentary borough of Boston returned one MP, while the Lincolnshire county division of Spalding, in the south-east of the historic county, elected another MP. In 1918 these two seats were merged to form this constituency.

When created in 1918 the constituency had the same boundaries as the traditional sub-division of the historic county known as the Parts of Holland, which had become an administrative county in 1889.

In 1997 the constituency was abolished and replaced by two new constituencies, Boston and Skegness and South Holland and The Deepings.

Boundaries 
1918–1974: The county of the Parts of Holland.

1974–1983: The Municipal Borough of Boston, the Urban District of Spalding, and the Rural Districts of Boston, East Elloe, and Spalding.

1983–1997: The Borough of Boston, and the District of South Holland wards of Donington, Fleet, Gedney, Holbeach Hurn, Holbeach St John, Holbeach Town, Long Sutton, Moulton, Sutton Bridge, The Saints, and Whaplode.

Members of Parliament

Election results

Elections in the 1910s

Elections in the 1920s

Elections in the 1930s 

General Election 1939–40

Another General Election was required to take place before the end of 1940. The political parties had been making preparations for an election to take place and by the Autumn of 1939, the following candidates had been selected; 
Liberal National: Herbert Butcher
Labour: E Kennedy
British Union: Sylvia Morris

Elections in the 1940s

Elections in the 1950s

Elections in the 1960s

Elections in the 1970s

Elections in the 1980s

Elections in the 1990s

See also 
List of parliamentary constituencies in Lincolnshire
 1924 Holland with Boston by-election
 1929 Holland with Boston by-election
 1937 Holland with Boston by-election

Notes and references

Sources
http://www.psr.keele.ac.uk/area/uk.htm Area Studies, UK: politics, elections and government in Britain
 Boundaries of Parliamentary Constituencies 1885-1972, compiled and edited by F.W.S. Craig (Parliamentary Reference Publications 1972)
 British Parliamentary Constituencies: A Statistical Compendium, by Ivor Crewe and Anthony Fox (Faber and Faber 1984)
 

Parliamentary constituencies in Lincolnshire (historic)
Constituencies of the Parliament of the United Kingdom established in 1918
Constituencies of the Parliament of the United Kingdom disestablished in 1997
Parts of Holland